West Ottawa Soccer Club was a Canadian women's semi-professional soccer club based in Kanata, Ontario, just west of Ottawa that competed in the women's division League1 Ontario. The club continues to operate as a youth club.

History
The club was founded in 2010 as a youth soccer club when local clubs Goulbourn Soccer Club and Kanata Soccer Club decided to merge to form the West Ottawa Soccer Club.

The club joined the women's division of League1 Ontario for the 2017 season becoming the first team in the league from Ottawa. They played their first match against Vaughan Azzurri losing 2-1. They left the league following the 2018 season.

In 2017, the club formed a partnership with Major League Soccer club Montreal Impact’s Academy, becoming the first club from Ontario to partner with them.

Seasons 
Women

Notable former players
The following players have either played at the professional or international level, either before or after playing for the League1 Ontario team:

References

Soccer clubs in Ontario
League1 Ontario teams
Women's soccer clubs in Canada
Soccer clubs in Ottawa
Sports teams in Ottawa